Wombourn railway station was the main intermediate station on the Wombourne Branch Line, situated at the Bratch. It was opened by the Great Western Railway in 1925 and closed in 1932. It was a grandiose affair with a goods yard and many station amenities. This, however, didn't stop poor patronage which led to the station's closure a mere seven years after opening. It remained in use for freight traffic until the line passing through the station was closed on 24 June 1965.

The building survives, however, and is now a tearoom, popular with walkers, and an information centre. It also is the second only station building to still be still in situ on the South Staffordshire Railway Walk.

The station itself was named Wombourn, the standard spelling of the time, in preference to the spelling Wombourne. This is the result of a decision made by the Great Western Railway, who feared confusion with the similarly named Wimborne.

References

Further reading

Disused railway stations in Staffordshire
South Staffordshire District
Former Great Western Railway stations
Railway stations in Great Britain opened in 1925
Railway stations in Great Britain closed in 1932
Wombourne